The Ministry of Power, Energy and Mineral Resources (Bidyuṯ, jbālāni ō khanija sampada mantraṇālaẏa) (abbreviated as MPEMR) or Ministry of Energy is a ministry of the Government of Bangladesh. It is mainly responsible for all policies and matters relating to electricity generation, transmission, and distribution from conventional and non-conventional energy sources including hydro electricity. It also deals with the Import, Distribution, Exploration, Extraction, Pricing, and other policy related details of the primary fuels.

The MPEMR has two Divisions headed by two secretaries:
Power Division
Energy and Mineral Resources Division

Senior officials

Ministerial team
The ministerial team at the MPEMR is headed by the Prime Minister of Bangladesh, who is assigned to them to manage the ministers office and ministry.

 Minister in charge — Sheikh Hasina (Prime Minister)
 Minister of state  — Nasrul Hamid

Departments

Power Division

Bangladesh Power Development Board
Dhaka Electric Supply Company Limited
Dhaka Power Distribution Company Limited
Ashuganj Power Station Company Limited.
Electricity Generation Company Limited.
West Zone Power Distribution Company Limited.
Bangladesh Rural Electrification Board
Rural Power Company Limited
Power Cell
Power Grid Company of Bangladesh
North West Power Generation Company Limited 
Sustainable and Renewable Energy Development Authority (SREDA)
Northern Electricity Supply Company Limited
Bangladesh Energy and Power Research Council (EPRC)

Energy and Mineral Resources Division
Geological Survey of Bangladesh
Bakhrabad Gas Distribution Company Limited
Sylhet Gas Fields Limited
Mineral Resources Development Bureau
Titas Gas Transmission and Distribution Company
Bangladesh Energy Regulatory Commission
Bangladesh Oil, Gas and Mineral Corporation
Bangladesh Petroleum Institute
Geological Survey of Bangladesh
Bangladesh Hydrocarbon Unit
Department of Explosives
Rupantarita Prakritik Gas Company Limited

References 

 
Ministry of Power, Energy and Mineral Resources